Philippe "Phil" Myers (born January 25, 1997) is a Canadian professional ice hockey defenceman who currently plays for the Syracuse Crunch in the American Hockey League (AHL) while under contract to the Tampa Bay Lightning of the National Hockey League (NHL).

Early life 
Myers was born on January 25, 1997, in Moncton, New Brunswick, and was raised in Dieppe, New Brunswick. He is the only child of Dave and Suzanne Myers, and relied on his family for motivation throughout his hockey career. The son of an English-speaking father and bilingual mother, Myers attended Francophone school, and became comfortable in both French and English. As an adolescent, he played minor ice hockey with the Moncton Flyers midget AAA league.

Playing career

Junior 
The Rouyn-Noranda Huskies of the Quebec Major Junior Hockey League (QMJHL) selected Myers in the fourth round, 58th overall, of the 2013 QMJHL Entry Draft.

Professional

Philadelphia Flyers 
Myers was signed as an undrafted free agent by the Flyers on September 21, 2015. After his stellar play during the 2015–16 QMJHL season, NHL scouts believed he would have been a first-round pick in the 2016 NHL Entry Draft if the Flyers had not signed him. He made his NHL debut on February 17, 2019, in a game against the Detroit Red Wings. Myers would go on to score his first career goal on March 6, 2019, in a game against the Washington Capitals.

Myers was one of the Flyers' final roster cuts as they entered the  season, but he was called up on October 31 to add life to a team that had lost their last two games by a combined 12–4 score. With seven defensemen on their roster, Myers was part of a three-man platoon with Robert Hägg and occasionally Shayne Gostisbehere through the first half of the season. By the end of January, Myers had become a staple in the Flyers' lineup, tied with Carson Soucy of the Minnesota Wild for the best plus-minus (+16) among all NHL rookies. On the second defensive pairing with Travis Sanheim, Myers had four goals and 16 points in 50 games before the NHL season was prematurely suspended that March due to the COVID-19 pandemic. Shortly before the season's abrupt end, Myers fractured his right patella while blocking a shot from Jack Eichel of the Buffalo Sabres; he was expected to miss a month of play, leaving room for Gostisbehere, who had also suffered a knee injury earlier that year, to take his place in the lineup. By the time the NHL began crafting their "return to play" plan for the 2020 Stanley Cup playoffs, however, Myers had fully recovered from the injury and was ready to make his first postseason appearance alongside Sanheim. He played in all 16 playoff games before the Flyers were eliminated by the New York Islanders, contributing three goals and four points, including the overtime game-winning goal in Game 2 against the Islanders.

On December 8, 2020, the Flyers signed Myers to a three-year contract extension carrying an average annual value of $2.55 million. When the sudden retirement of Matt Niskanen left an unexpected gap on the Flyers' top defensive pairing, Myers was the first choice to play alongside Ivan Provorov for the  season. Only four games into the season, however, Myers suffered a fractured rib after colliding with Jake McCabe of the Buffalo Sabres, and Sanheim was promoted to the top line in his place. Even after he recovered, Myers moved in and out of the Flyers lineup as he struggled to regain his form from the previous season. The repeated benching was itself a cause of frustration, as limited time on the ice also gave players like Myers little opportunity to fix their performance. Through the first three-quarters of the season, Myers had only eight points, all assists, and a −12 rating, but he was confident that he was "definitely moving in the right direction" going into the last 11 games. Through 44 games of the pandemic-shortened season, Myers had one goal and 10 assists. That one goal came on April 27, in a 6–4 defeat at the hands of the New Jersey Devils. Myers's difficulties were especially pronounced on the defensive end: when he was on the ice, the Flyers' opponents scored 56 goals against them.

Nashville Predators 
On July 17, 2021, the Flyers traded Myers and Nolan Patrick to the Nashville Predators in exchange for defenseman Ryan Ellis. While Patrick was immediately flipped to the Vegas Golden Knights in exchange for Cody Glass, Myers remained with Nashville as part of their larger roster revamp, which aimed to create a strong core of younger players. Through the first 11 games of the  season, however, Myers played in only three, with Alexandre Carrier, Dante Fabbro, and Matt Benning serving as the Predators' right-side defensemen.  On March 23, 2022, days after Nashville placed Myers on waivers and clearing, he was loaned to the Toronto Marlies following a trade on March 21, that saw Alex Biega being traded to the Nashville Predators for future considerations. Myers being loaned to the Marlies was the future considerations aspect of the deal.

Tampa Bay Lightning
Following a tough first season with the Predators, on July 3, 2022, Myers was traded to the Tampa Bay Lightning along with Grant Mismash in exchange for Ryan McDonagh. On August 26, 2022, his contract was extended by one year for $1.4 million.

International play

Myers first represented Canada on the international stage at the 2017 World Junior Championships, held in Montreal-Toronto, Canada. He registered 3 assists in just 4 games as Canada claimed the Silver Medal as the host nation, losing the final to the United States. Partway through the tournament, Myers sustained an injury from Minnesota Wild prospect Luke Kunin that put him out of commission for the rest of the WJC.

Myers was a late inclusion to join Team Canada at the 2019 World Championships underway in Slovakia on May 15, 2019. Recalled to the squad as an injury replacement for Brandon Montour, Myers made his full international debut in a 5–2 round-robin victory over France on May 16, 2019. Myers helped Canada progress through to the playoff rounds before losing the final to Finland to finish with the Silver Medal on May 26, 2019. He finished the tournament posting 1 assist from the blueline in 7 games.

Personal life
Myers is a self-taught pianist who, rather than reading sheet music, learns music by ear from watching YouTube videos.

Career statistics

Regular season and playoffs

International

Awards and honours

References

External links

1997 births
Living people
Canadian ice hockey defencemen
Ice hockey people from New Brunswick
Lehigh Valley Phantoms players
Nashville Predators players
Philadelphia Flyers players
Rouyn-Noranda Huskies players
Sportspeople from Moncton
Syracuse Crunch players
Tampa Bay Lightning players
Toronto Marlies players
Undrafted National Hockey League players